Jane Ellen Henney (born 1947) is an American physician who was the first woman to serve as commissioner of the U.S. Food and Drug Administration. Appointed by President Bill Clinton, she served at the FDA from 1999 to 2001.

Education and career
Jane Henney was born in Woodburn, Indiana. She received her undergraduate training at Manchester University, an MD degree from Indiana University School of Medicine and did postgraduate work at the University of Texas MD Anderson Cancer Center in Houston. Trained as a medical oncologist, she joined the National Cancer Institute at the National Institutes of Health in 1976, working in the Cancer Therapy and Evaluation Program.

Prior to her appointment as commissioner, Henney had worked at the FDA from 1992 to 1994 as deputy commissioner for operations under then-commissioner David Aaron Kessler, and then at the University of New Mexico, where she was vice president of the health sciences center. After leaving the FDA she joined the board of directors of the pharmaceutical company AstraZeneca.

A significant and far reaching decision by the FDA under her tenure, was the ban on supplements and natural products that contain lovastatin, effectively handing exclusivity of cholesterol lowering compounds to pharmaceutical companies. AstraZeneca benefited directly from this decision this removed a cheap, natural product, from competing with their own statin rosuvastatin.

She was named senior vice president and provost for health affairs at the University of Cincinnati in 2003.

References
 Charles Marwick, "Jane E. Henney, MD, Is New FDA Commissioner", JAMA. 1998;280:1731-1732.

External links

 National library of Medicine about Jane Ellen Henney
 Jane E. Henney at the F.D.A. website
 

Living people
1947 births
American oncologists
Women oncologists
Manchester University (Indiana) alumni
Indiana University School of Medicine alumni
University of Texas MD Anderson Cancer Center alumni
University of New Mexico faculty
University of Cincinnati faculty
American women physicians
Commissioners of the Food and Drug Administration
Clinton administration personnel
21st-century American women
Members of the National Academy of Medicine